Mosjøen Idrettslag is a Norwegian sports club from Mosjøen, Vefsn, Nordland. It has sections for association football, gymnastics and skiing.

Mosjøen Turnforening (gymnastics) was founded in 1892, and this is also regarded as the foundation year of the current club. Mosjøen Fotballklubb (football) was founded separately in 1909. In 1914, the two clubs merged, and changed its name to the present name Mosjøen Idrettslag.

The men's football team currently plays in the Third Division, the fourth tier of Norwegian football. It last played in the Norwegian Second Division in 2000. Former players include Per Joar Hansen, Bent Inge Johnsen and Thomas Drage.

References

 Official site 

Football clubs in Norway
Sport in Nordland
Association football clubs established in 1892
Defunct athletics clubs in Norway
1892 establishments in Norway